The United States Permanent Representative to NATO (commonly called the U.S. Ambassador to NATO) is the official representative of the United States to the North Atlantic Treaty Organization. The Representative has the rank of full ambassador and is appointed by the president and confirmed by the Senate. The full official title of the Representative is United States Permanent Representative on the Council of the North Atlantic Treaty Organization, with the rank and status of Ambassador Extraordinary and Plenipotentiary. The position is currently held by Julianne Smith, having been confirmed by the Senate of November 18, 2021.

The first Representative was appointed by President Dwight D. Eisenhower in 1953.

List

References

Sources
List of NATO ambassadors — US State Department

External links
 

NATO
 
United States
NATO-related lists
United States and NATO
United States military policies